David Ross Aizer (born November 24, 1974) is an American television host, writer and producer. Currently he is the channel host for WSFL-TV The CW in South Florida. He hosts the weekly talk show Inside South Florida, as well as the morning news program Eye Opener. Previously, he hosted The Morning Show—a daily, live television morning show on WSFL.

Career
Prior to his work at WSFL, Aizer was an anchor/reporter for The Onion News Network and a contributor/reporter for Hollywood's Top 10 on Reelz. He also created/exec produced and hosted "Bleacherbloggers.com", an online sports talk show centered on the sports blogging community. In addition, he's served as a writer for Tru TV, and hosted shows for Spike TV, American Idol Online and more.

Aizer hosted the hit Nickelodeon show Slime Time Live and is in the Guinness Book of World Records for the most slime dumped at one time. In addition, he hosted Nickelodeon GAS, and Nickelodeon Robot Wars on Nickelodeon.

Prior to his success on Nickelodeon, Aizer hosted Disney's ESPN Club interviewing professional athletes such as Joe Namath, Pete Rose, Barry Bonds, and Reggie Jackson. He also served as a play by play broadcaster and sports director for the University of Miami's student radio station, WVUM.

In addition, Aizer was a member of the Groundlings Improv Comedy Troupe in Los Angeles.

Aizer graduated from Marjory Stoneman Douglas High School and the University of Miami.

References

External links

1974 births
Living people
Television personalities from Florida
Radio personalities from Florida
Place of birth missing (living people)
People from Coral Springs, Florida
University of Miami alumni